Mass cytometry is a mass spectrometry technique based on inductively coupled plasma mass spectrometry and time of flight mass spectrometry used for the determination of the properties of cells (cytometry). In this approach, antibodies are conjugated with isotopically pure elements, and these antibodies are used to label cellular proteins. Cells are nebulized and sent through an argon plasma, which ionizes the metal-conjugated antibodies. The metal signals are then analyzed by a time-of-flight mass spectrometer. The approach overcomes limitations of spectral overlap in flow cytometry by utilizing discrete isotopes as a reporter system instead of traditional fluorophores which have broad emission spectra.

Commercialization
Tagging technology and instrument development occurred at the University of Toronto and DVS Sciences, Inc. CyTOF (cytometry by time of flight) was initially commercialized by DVS Sciences in 2009. In 2014, Fluidigm acquired DVS Sciences  to become a reference company in single cell technology. In 2022 Fluidigm received a capitol infusion and changed its name to Standard BioTools.  The CyTOF, CyTOF2, Helios (CyTOF3) and CyTOF XT(4th generation) have been commercialized up to now. Fluidigm sells a variety of commonly used metal-antibody conjugates, and an antibody conjugation kit.

Data analysis
Mass cytometry data is recorded in tables that list, for each cell, the signal detected per channel, which is proportional to the number of antibodies tagged with the corresponding channel's isotope bound to that cell. These data are formatted as FCS files, which are compatible with traditional flow cytometry software. Due to the high-dimensional nature of mass cytometry data, novel data analysis tools have been developed as well.

Advantages and disadvantages
Advantages include minimal overlap in metal signals meaning the instrument is theoretically capable of detecting 100 parameters per cell, entire cell signaling networks can be inferred organically without reliance on prior knowledge, and one well-constructed experiment produces large amounts of data.

Disadvantages include the practical flow rate is around 500 cells per second versus several thousand in flow cytometry and current reagents available limit cytometer use to around 50 parameters per cell. Additionally, mass cytometry is a destructive method and cells cannot be sorted for further analysis.

Applications
Mass cytometry has research applications in medical fields including immunology, hematology, and oncology. It has been used in studies of hematopoiesis, cell cycle, cytokine expression, and differential signaling responses.

References

Scientific techniques
Mass spectrometry
Analytical chemistry
Cell biology
Clinical pathology
Flow cytometry
Laboratory techniques